La tempestad (International translation: The Tempest, dubbed The Storm by Univision) is a 2013 Mexican telenovela produced by Salvador Mejía Alejandre for Televisa. It is loosely based on the Colombian telenovela La Tormenta, produced by R.T.I. Colombia for Telemundo and Caracol Televisión.

William Levy and Ximena Navarrete star as the protagonists, while Iván Sánchez, Laura Carmine, and César Évora star as the antagonists.

Cast

Main 
 William Levy as Damián Fabré / Michel Fabré
 Ximena Navarrete as Marina Reverte / Magdalena Reverte
 Iván Sánchez as Hernán Saldaña
 César Évora as Fulgencio Salazar
 María Sorté as Beatriz de Reverte 
 Daniela Romo as Mercedes Artigas

Secondary 
 Nora Salinas as Rebeca
 Manuel Ojeda as Ernesto Contreras
 Alejandro Ibarra as Bagre
 Sharis Cid as Candy
 Sergio Reynoso as Comandante Robles
 Alfonso Iturralde as Padre Tomás Alcántara
 Latin Lover as El Oso
 Gilberto de Anda as Nereo
 Lucero Lander as Delfina Mata de Salazar
 Eduardo Liñán as Dr. González
 Adalberto Parra as Valdivia
 Luis Manuel Ávila as Olinto
 Amparo Garrido as Alicia
 Fernando Larrañaga as Dr. San Miguel
 Malisha Quintana as Mayuya Canseco
 Janet Ruiz as Rosario Alcántara
 Salvador Ibarra as Lagarto
 Fernando Robles as Lara
 Francisco Martin as Lolo
 José Antonio Ferral as Toribio
 Amor Flores as Jazmín "Lucía" Jiménez
 Enrique Zepeda as Lázaro Salazar Alcántara 
 Laura Carmine as Esther "Esthercita" Salazar Mata

Recurring 
 Mauricio Hénao as Valentín
 René Casados as Claudio Petrone
 Mariana Seoane as Úrsula Mata
 Arturo Carmona as José

Guest 
 La Sonora Santanera as Herself
 Andrés Gutiérrez as Lic. Jacobo Souza
 Yessica Salazar as Dr. Antonieta Narváez
 Arturo Peniche as Ariel Reverte

Mexico broadcast
On May 13, 2013, Canal de las Estrellas started broadcasting La tempestad weeknights at 9:30pm, replacing Amores verdaderos. The last episode was broadcast on October 27, with Lo que la vida me robó replacing it the following day. Production of La tempestad officially started on April 4, 2013.

United States broadcast
On June 11, 2013, Univision confirmed a July 2013 broadcast of La Tempestad. On July 29, 2013, Univision started broadcasting La tempestad weeknights at 9pm/8c, replacing Amores verdaderos. Just like Qué bonito amor, Univision aired an abridged version of La Tempestad, heavily editing the episodes to end the telenovela quickly. 80 episodes were broadcast during its run. The last episode was broadcast on November 15, 2013, with Lo que la vida me robó replacing it on November 18.

The European premiere was in Slovenia on channel POP TV.

Soundtrack

Awards and nominations

References

External links
Official website 

Mexican telenovelas
Televisa telenovelas
2013 telenovelas
2013 Mexican television series debuts
2013 Mexican television series endings
Mexican television series based on Colombian television series
Spanish-language telenovelas